Tracheloteina is a genus of moths belonging to the family Tineidae.

References

Tineidae
Tineidae genera